The 2017 NA LCS season was the fifth year of the North American League of Legends Championship Series (NA LCS), a professional esports league for the MOBA PC game League of Legends. It was divided into spring and summer splits, each consisting of a regular season and playoff stage, and also included a promotion tournament and a regional qualifiers for the World Championship.

To qualify for the World Championship, a team must either be the summer champions, have the most championship points, or win the regional qualifier. The three teams that qualified for the 2017 World Championship in these ways were Team SoloMid, Immortals and Cloud9, respectively.

Format Changes 

The format of the 2017 regular summer season gave every team the opportunity to play a best of three for every match. The first team to win two out of the three games, takes the match. Teams played on Friday, Saturday, and Sunday; every Friday two matches were played, and every Saturday and Sunday there were four matches played. Between weeks 5 and 6, the NA LCS took a break to participate in Rift Rivals, a competitive tournament for boasting rights against the European LCS. In this tournament, North America sent Team SoloMid, Cloud9, and Phoenix1 to represent the region. The 2017 regular summer season started on Friday, June 2, 2017, and by the end of summer, there were nine weeks of competition and over 200 games played.

The top six teams of the regular season earned a spot in the Playoffs. Playoffs consisted of three rounds: Quarterfinals, Semifinals, and Finals. The top two teams from the regular season automatically qualified for Semifinals while the four other teams played in the Quarterfinals. The winners of the Quarterfinals move onto the Semifinals. With the use of dynamic seeding, the highest seeded team, plays against the lowest seeded team that moved onto the Semifinals, and the second highest seeded team plays against the remaining team. The two winners of the Semifinals play in the Finals, while the two losers play for third place.
Quarterfinals and Semifinals played in the Battle Arena while the Finals played at the TD Garden in Boston, MA. All matches are best of five.

The promotion tournament for the 2018 spring split was played between the bottom two NA LCS teams and the top two Challenger Series teams from the 2017 summer split. This tournament was a three-day event; on the first day, each NA LCS teams play against CS team. The winners from day one continue on in the winners bracket, on day two, where they play against each other to determine who will get to play in the NA LCS next split. The losers from day one go onto the losers bracket, also on the second day, where they play against each other to determine who will get a final chance to qualify for the NA LCS next split. On day three, the winner of the losers bracket plays against the loser of the winners bracket. The winner of day three will play in the NA LCS next split. This was the last promotion tournament of the NA LCS, and the results were ultimately irrelevant, due to the league changing to a franchised model in 2018.

The Regional Qualifiers are played between four highest point holders at the end of the season, save the two teams who previously qualified for the 2017 League of Legends World Championship. There are three rounds: The first round was played between the 4th and 5th point holders, the second round was played between the winner of the first round and the 3rd point holder, and the final round was played between the winner of the second round and the 2nd point holder. The winner of the last round qualified for the World Championship as North America's 3rd seed.

Summer

Teams and rosters

Regular season

Playoffs

Promotion tournament

Teams

Results

Knockout stage 

Team Liquid and Phoenix1 both won the promotion tournament, and would normally retain their spots in the NA LCS, however due to league-wide changes to a franchised model, they were no longer guaranteed a spot.

Regional qualifiers

References 

League of Legends Championship Series seasons
2017 multiplayer online battle arena tournaments
North American League of Legends Championship
North American League of Legends Championship